Danger Island (1931) is a Universal pre-Code film serial. It is considered to be lost. Kenneth Harlan played Captain Drake (the hero), and Lucile Brown played heroine Bonnie Adams. The film also co-starred Andy Devine.

Plot
Bonnie Adams is told by her father Professor Adams on his death bed of his discovery of a radium deposit on an island off the coast of Africa.  Ben Arnold and his girlfriend Aileen Chandos want the radium for themselves and befriend Bonnie for that purpose.  The captain of the boat taking them to their destination, Harry Drake, falls in love with Bonnie en route.

Cast
 Kenneth Harlan as Harry Drake
 Lucile Browne as Bonnie Adams
 Tom Ricketts as Professor Adams
 Walter Miller as Ben Arnold
 William L. Thorne as Bull Black
 Beulah Hutton as Aileen Calindos
 Andy Devine as Briney
 George Regas as Lascara
 Everett Brown as Cebu

Chapter titles
 The Coast of Peril
 Death Rides the Storm
 Demons of the Pool
 Devil Worshippers
 Mutiny
 The Cat Creeps
 The Drums of Doom
 Human Sacrifice
 The Devil Bird
 Captured For Sacrifice
 The Lion's Lair
 Fire God's vengeance
Source:

See also
 List of film serials by year
 List of film serials by studio

References

External links
 

1931 films
1931 adventure films
American black-and-white films
1930s English-language films
Universal Pictures film serials
Films directed by Ray Taylor
Lost American films
American adventure films
1931 lost films
Lost adventure films
1930s American films